William Ford (born December 15, 1986) is an American football running back who is currently a free agent. He played college football at South Carolina State University and attended Travelers Rest High School in Travelers Rest, South Carolina. Ford was a CFL East Division All-Star in 2013 as a member of the Winnipeg Blue Bombers. He has also been a member of the Saskatchewan Roughriders and Toronto Argonauts of the Canadian Football League.

College career
Ford is second all-time in rushing yards and first in rushing touchdowns in South Carolina State University and Mid-Eastern Athletic Conference history with 4,688 yards and 35 touchdowns.

Professional career

Toronto Argonauts
Ford was signed by the Toronto Argonauts in 2010 but released before seeing any playing time after suffering a leg injury.

Winnipeg Blue Bombers
Ford was signed by the Winnipeg Blue Bombers in July 2012. He was a CFL East Division All-Star in 2013.

Ford was released by the Blue Bombers in July 2014.

Saskatchewan Roughriders
Ford was signed by the Saskatchewan Roughriders on July 22, 2014. On July 26, 2014, he scored three rushing touchdowns against the Toronto Argonauts in his first game for the Roughriders. He was released by the Roughriders on October 21, 2014.

References

External links
Just Sports Stats
Saskatchewan Roughriders profile
NFL Draft Scout profile

Living people
1986 births
Players of American football from South Carolina
American football running backs
Canadian football running backs
Players of Canadian football from South Carolina
African-American players of American football
African-American players of Canadian football
South Carolina State Bulldogs football players
Winnipeg Blue Bombers players
Saskatchewan Roughriders players
People from Travelers Rest, South Carolina
21st-century African-American sportspeople
20th-century African-American people